Beilngries is a town in the district of Eichstätt, in Bavaria, Germany. It is situated on the river Altmühl and the Rhine-Main-Danube Canal, 30 km north of Ingolstadt.

Sons and daughters of the city 

 Rosa Aschenbrenner (1885-1967), socialist politician, member of the Bavarian Landtag 1921-1932 and 1946-1948
 Karl Harrer (1890-1926), sport journalist and founding member and party chairman of the German Workers' Party, the predecessor organization of the Nationalsozialistische Deutschen Arbeiterpartei (NSDAP)

References

Eichstätt (district)